The Davis Totem was an American automobile manufactured from 1921 until 1922.  As many as ten were built; they boasted friction drive similar to that found in their contemporaries, the Kelsey and the Metz.  The cars used four-cylinder Herschell-Spillman engines.  The touring car, which seated five, was listed at $1695.

References
David Burgess Wise, The New Illustrated Encyclopedia of the Automobile

Defunct motor vehicle manufacturers of the United States